Family Matters is an American television sitcom that debuted on ABC on September 22, 1989, and ended on May 9, 1997. However it moved to CBS, where it was shown from September 19, 1997, to July 17, 1998. A spin-off of Perfect Strangers, the series revolves around the Winslow family, a middle class black family living in Chicago, Illinois. Midway through the first season, the show introduced the Winslows' nerdy neighbor Steve Urkel (Jaleel White), who was originally scripted to appear as a one-time character. However, he quickly became the show's breakout character (and eventually the main character), joining the main cast.

Running for nine seasons, Family Matters became the second-longest-running live action U.S. sitcom with a predominantly African-American cast, behind only The Jeffersons (11 seasons). It aired for 215 episodes, being ranked third, behind only Tyler Perry's House of Payne (280+ as of 2021), and The Jeffersons (253). Family Matters was the last live-action scripted primetime show that debuted in the 1980s to leave the air; the only scripted show that started in the 1980s and lasted longer in continuous production was The Simpsons.

History 
The series was a spinoff from the ABC sitcom Perfect Strangers; both shows aired Friday nights on ABC's primetime slot called "TGIF". Jo Marie Payton played Harriette Winslow, the elevator operator at a newspaper where Larry Appleton and Balki Bartokomous also worked. Reginald VelJohnson, who was coming off of growing fame from his role in Die Hard, made an appearance on the show as Harriette's husband Carl Winslow, a Chicago police officer. ABC and the producers loved the character Harriette for her great morale and quick-witted humor and decided to create a show that would focus on her and her family, husband Carl, son Eddie, elder daughter Laura, and younger daughter Judy (who appeared until the character was retconned after season four).

In the pilot episode, "The Mama Who Came to Dinner", the family had also opened their home to Carl's street-wise mother, Estelle (Rosetta LeNoire), usually known as "Mother Winslow". Prior to the start of the series, Harriette's sister, Rachel Crawford and her infant son, Richie, had moved into the Winslow household after the death of Rachel's husband. The Winslows' nerdy teenage next-door neighbor, Steve Urkel (Jaleel White), was introduced midway through the first season in the episode "Laura’s First Date" and quickly became the focus of the show.

The popular sitcom was a mainstay of ABC's TGIF lineup from 1989 until 1997, at which point it became part of the CBS Block Party lineup for its final season. Family Matters was produced by Bickley-Warren Productions (1991–1998) and Miller-Boyett Productions, in association with Lorimar Television (1989–1993) and later Warner Bros. Television (1993–1998). As the show progressed, episodes began to center increasingly on Steve Urkel, and other original characters also played by White, including Steve's suave alter-ego, Stefan Urquelle, and his female cousin, Myrtle Urkel.

Network change 
In early 1997, CBS picked up Family Matters and Step by Step in a $40 million deal to acquire the rights to the programs from ABC. ABC then promised to pay Miller-Boyett Productions $1.5 million per episode for a ninth and tenth season of Family Matters. However, tensions had risen between Miller-Boyett Productions and ABC's corporate parent, The Walt Disney Company (which had bought the network in 1995 as part of its merger with ABC's then-parent Capital Cities/ABC Inc.). Miller-Boyett thought that it would not be a big player on ABC after the network's recent purchase by Disney.

Miller-Boyett Productions agreed to a $40 million offer from CBS for a 22-episode season for both Family Matters and Step By Step. CBS scheduled Family Matters along with Meego and Step By Step as a part of its new Friday lineup, branded as the CBS Block Party. The network scheduled the family-oriented block against ABC's TGIF lineup, where the two series originated. Jo Marie Payton's contract had just expired and she was reluctant to continue, feeling the show had jumped the shark years prior. She agreed to stay to keep continuity but left midseason shortly after very nearly getting into a physical altercation with White in what would be her last regular episode; in that episode, White (playing a gangster instead of his usual Urkel) was attempting to insert material that violated Broadcast Standards and Practices, angering Payton to the point where Darius McCrary had to separate the two. Payton would appear in only one more episode after that—a Christmas episode that also brought back several former characters from the ABC run who had been written out on CBS—before Judyann Elder took over as Harriette for the remainder of the season.

While Family Matters continued to lose viewership compared to previous years, it was initially a modest success on CBS, beating the show that replaced it, You Wish. Meego, however, was a ratings failure and was canceled after six weeks. Near the end of the ninth season, the cast was informed that a tenth and final season was planned, so scripts and plot synopses were written for the show. After the holiday special season, CBS replaced Meego with Kids Say the Darndest Things, and with that show's child-centered focus, it was placed in Family Matters 8/7c time slot, with Family Matters pushed an hour later and paired with Step by Step. The ratings for Family Matters fell even further in this later slot, and the entire block except for Kids Say... was canceled in spring 1998, with the remaining episodes burned off in the summer.

Cast

Episodes

Production notes 

Family Matters was created by William Bickley and Michael Warren (who also wrote for, and were producers of parent series Perfect Strangers) and developed by Thomas L. Miller and Robert L. Boyett (who also served as executive producers on Perfect Strangers); all four also served as executive producers of the series. The series was produced by Miller-Boyett Productions, in association with Lorimar Television who co-produced the show until 1993, when Warner Bros. Television absorbed Lorimar (a sister company under the co-ownership of Time Warner).

Starting with season three, the series was also produced by Bickley-Warren Productions. The series was filmed in front of a live studio audience; the Lorimar-produced episodes were shot at Lorimar Studios (later Sony Pictures Studios) in Culver City, California, while the Warner Bros.-produced episodes were filmed at Warner Bros. Studios in nearby Burbank.

The show's original theme was Louis Armstrong's "What a Wonderful World"; it was scrapped after the fifth episode of season one ("Straight A's"), though it was heard only in the pilot episode in syndicated reruns. The second theme, "As Days Go By", written by Jesse Frederick, Bennett Salvay and Scott Roeme and performed by Frederick, was the theme for the majority of the series until 1995. The sixth season's opening credits was last used in the season seven episodes "Talk's Cheap" and "Fa La La La Laagghh", the only two episodes during the final three seasons to feature the theme song (this was heard in season one episodes in ABC Family and syndicated airings). A longer version of "As Days Go By" was used during the first three seasons, though in syndicated reruns the short version is heard (in ABC Family airings, the long theme was used for all of the episodes during the first three seasons).

Family Matters is set in the same fictional universe as several other TV shows related to ABC's TGIF or CBS's Block Party. Before Family Matters, Harriette Winslow was originally the elevator operator at the Chicago Chronicle newspaper office in the third and fourth seasons of Perfect Strangers. Family Matters was a spin-off series given to this character in 1989. Characters from Family Matters appeared on other shows, including Full House, Boy Meets World, Step by Step and Meego.

Syndication 
In September 1993, Warner Bros. Television Distribution began distributing Family Matters for broadcast in off-network syndication; most television stations stopped carrying the show by around 2002, though some stations in larger markets such as WTOG in Tampa, Florida continued to air Family Matters until as recently as 2005 and New York's WPIX as 2006. In 1995, reruns of the series began airing on TBS Superstation, where it ran until 2003. TBS would air two episodes of Family Matters each weekday afternoon from October 1995 to September 1999.  From 1999 to 2003, TBS only aired the series once per weekday typically playing in the early mornings. The series would return to TBS 17 years later on February 3, 2020 and airs in the early morning time slots paired with George Lopez. 

From 1997 to 2003, reruns of the series aired on WGN America. In 2003, ABC Family picked up the series and aired it for five years until February 29, 2008. From 2004 to 2006, UPN aired the show for 2 years. BET aired reruns briefly in December 2009 and began airing the series on a regular basis on March 1, 2013. MTV2 also began airing reruns on September 7, 2013. The show aired on Nick at Nite from June 29, 2008 to December 31, 2012. ABC Family and Nick at Nite airings cut the tag scenes at the end of all episodes, despite the fact that many episodes during the series have tag scenes during the closing credits. In 2019, the series now airs on TVOne. In Canada, the series also aired on CTV, CBC and currently airs on Family Channel.

On September 29, 2017, Family Matters became available for streaming on Hulu. In the UK it aired on Sky One whilst Perfect Strangers aired on BBC One.

Reruns of the series also started airing on Cartoon Network's ACME Night block on September 19, 2021.

On October 1, 2021, Family Matters began streaming on HBO Max after its streaming rights expired from Hulu.,

International airings
In France, it aired as La Vie de famille (Family Life) as part of the show Club Dorothée on January 1, 1995 and on RTL9 (from August 28, 1995), France 2 & M6 (from June 1, 2000).

In Italy, it aired as Otto sotto un tetto (Eight under one roof) on Canale 5, Italia 1 in 1992, with subsequent airings on Fox Retro & Sky Atlantic.

Home media 
Warner Home Video has released the first four seasons of Family Matters on DVD in Region 1 while the remaining five seasons were released by the Warner Archive Collection. On February 4, 2014, Warner Home Video released season 4 on DVD, but consumers complained when it was found that the season 4 set contained syndication edits rather than the original broadcast masters. Warner Bros. responded to the complaints, offered a replacement program to receive corrected discs and reissuing the set with corrected broadcast copies on April 4, 2014. All episodes are the original broadcast form, except for the episode "Number One With a Bullet", disc 1, episode 6. The entire series is also available for digital download on Amazon.com and the iTunes Store, all but season 6 remastered in both SD and HD.

Animated Christmas TV movie 
On September 1, 2021, it was announced an animated Christmas film Did I Do That to the Holidays? A Steve Urkel Story would air on Cartoon Network as part of the block ACME Night in 2022. It was set to be released on HBO Max. However, on August 22, 2022, it was announced the film will not be moving forward on HBO Max and will be shopped elsewhere due to the Warner Bros. Discovery merger. Current bidders are Apple TV+, Hulu and Netflix.

Accolades

Notes

References

External links 

 
 
 Family Matters at Nick at Nite

 
1989 American television series debuts
1998 American television series endings
1980s American black sitcoms
1990s American black sitcoms
1990s American sitcoms
American Broadcasting Company original programming
American television spin-offs
CBS original programming
English-language television shows
Television shows filmed in Los Angeles
Television shows filmed in California
Fictional portrayals of the Chicago Police Department
Television series about families
Television series about genetic engineering
Television series by Lorimar Television
Television series by Warner Bros. Television Studios
Television shows set in Chicago
TGIF (TV programming block)
Television series about siblings